Marampilly (N.Vazhakulam ) is a village in the Ernakulam district in the Indian state of Kerala.

Location

Demographics
 India census, Marambilly had a population of 20,071 with 10,224 males and 9847 females. It is 73.28% Musliam, 24.48% Hindu, and 2.13% Christian. Marambilly  is located between Aluva and Perumbavoor, 8 kilometres away from both towns.  There is a bridge to cross the Periyar River from Marambilly  to Vellarappilly (Thiruvairanikulam).

Marambilly  is a junction with roads to South Vazhakkulam and Vellarappilly, with a bank, automated teller machine, hospital, college, computer shop (events), schools, supermarket, temples, masjid, church and other small industries.

The nearest place is Manjapetty.  There are four temples and a Masjid.  Manjapetty Jangar service operates across Periyar river joining the old Travancore and Kochi states. The northern bank of Periyar was the birthplace (Puthiyedam) of Shakthan Thampuran, one of the reputed kings who ruled Kochi state from 1790 to 1805.  There is an ancient temple in Puthiyedam. The pilgrim centre of the Christian community, St. Sebastian Church, Kanjoor is near the temple.

References

Villages in Ernakulam district